Bankes Coffee Stores (also known as E. Bankes & Co.) was a chain of stores that operated in the Chicago region throughout the early 20th century. The company was founded by Ireland born Edward Bankes. Dubbed "the Starbucks of Chicago" during its peak the company operated over 20 stores.

See also 
 List of coffeehouse chains

References 

Companies based in Chicago